Michel Duc (born 9 September 1960) is a retired Swiss football defender.

References

1960 births
Living people
Swiss men's footballers
FC Bulle players
FC Lausanne-Sport players
Association football defenders
Swiss Super League players